Ferzol, also spelled Forzol, Ferzul or Fourzol, is a village located in the Zahlé District of the Beqaa Governorate in Lebanon.

El Fourzol is situated south of Nabi Ayla, and west of Ablah.

History
In 1838, Eli Smith noted Ferzol's population being Catholics.

References

Bibliography

 

Populated places in Zahlé District